Kraken is a rock band founded in Medellín, Colombia, in 1983. The current lineup consists of Roxana Restrepo (vocals), Andrés Leiva (guitar), Ricardo Wolff (guitar), Julian Puerto (drums), Luis Alberto Ramírez (bass guitar), and Rubén Gelvez (electronic keyboards). The sound of the band is characterized by a mixture of hard rock and heavy metal.

The influence of the original lead singer Elkin Ramírez, was compared by some publications to that of Freddie Mercury or Bruce Dickinson. Ramírez was also influenced by Led Zeppelin. Another influence of his was classical music, which he taught himself upon the advice of his father. Ramirez was commonly referred as "Elkin Kraken" amongst the fans.

Guitarist Andrés Leiva contributed his symphonic experience to the band, gained as a student of the classical guitarist Pedro de Alcántara. Leiva has been a member of a variety of different musical projects. On 18 December 2013, the band celebrated its 30th anniversary and filmed the show for a DVD that was released the following year.

Ramírez died from brain cancer on 29 January 2017 in Medellín. He was 54 years old.

Discography

Studio albums
 Kraken I (1987)
 Kraken II (1989)
 Kraken III (1990)
 Kraken IV: Piel de Cobre (1993)
 Kraken V: El Símbolo de la Huella (1995)
 Kraken: Una Leyenda del Rock (1999)
 Humana Deshumanización (2009)
 Sobre esta tierra (2016)

Live and compilation albums
 Kraken I + II (1994)
 Kraken en Vivo: Huella y Camino (2002)
 Kraken IV + V - Vive el Rock Nacional (2004) 
 Kraken Filarmónico (2006)

Tributes
 Tributo al Titán (2004) 
 Tributo Internacional a Kraken (2008)

References

External links
Official website (in Spanish)
Kraken concert review from 2013 (in English)

Colombian heavy metal musical groups
Rock en Español music groups
Musical quintets
Musical groups from Medellín